Ardozyga melicrata is a species of moth in the family Gelechiidae. It was described by Turner in 1919. It is found in Australia, where it has been recorded from northern Queensland.

The forewings are whitish-ochreous. The stigmata are obsolete or rarely faintly indicated by minute ochreous dots. The hindwings are pale-grey.

References

Ardozyga
Moths described in 1919
Moths of Australia